Lero-Lero (2010), is the first solo album from Brazilian artist, Luísa Maita, released on the independent label Cumbancha. The album features a variety of sounds from samba and bossa nova to western jazz and downtempo electronic. Lero-Lero precedes two different remixed versions of the album: Maita Remixed and Maita Remixed DJ Edition.

Track listing

References

Further reading
Mezzic
Guardian
Exclaim
Lemellotron

2010 debut albums
Luísa Maita albums
Cumbancha albums
Portuguese-language albums